Nima Delavari is an Iranian football defender who plays for Chooka Talesh in League 2

Club career

Malavan
He started his career with Mehravarn Talesh youth levels. Later he joined to Malavan Academy and spent three season with Malavan youth levels. He joined to first team by Farhad Pourgholami and made his debut for Malavan in 2013–14 Iran Pro League against Saba Qom as a starter.

Club career statistics

References

External links
 Nima Delavari at IranLeague.ir

Living people
Iranian footballers
Malavan players
1991 births
Association football defenders